The CAmion Équipé d'un Système d'ARtillerie (English: Truck equipped with an artillery system) or CAESAR is a French 155 mm, 52-calibre self-propelled howitzer installed on a 6x6 or 8x8 truck chassis that can fire all 39/52 caliber NATO-standard shells.

Units manufactured for the French Army use a 6x6 Renault Sherpa 5 chassis, while exported versions have been integrated on the 6x6 Unimog U2450L chassis or the 8x8 Tatra 817 chassis for example. The CAESAR platform was developed by French defense contractor GIAT Industries (now known as Nexter) and has been exported to various countries including Belgium, Denmark, the Czech Republic, Indonesia, Saudi Arabia, Thailand and Ukraine.

Development
CAESAR was developed in the 1990s as a technology demonstrator by the French state-owned company GIAT Industries, in cooperation with Lohr Industrie. It was first shown in public in 1994. Four years later, a pre-production model underwent trials with the French Army.

Under ordinary conditions, Nexter can produce 10 CAESARs per year. The 2022 Russian invasion of Ukraine boosted demand. By early 2023 Nexter's factory in Bourges was producing 2-4 a month in continuous operation. It was planned to produce 8 CAESARs a month by December 2023.

Design

The CAESAR is a wheeled, 155mm 52-caliber self-propelled howitzer. It holds 18 rounds and is typically operated by a crew of five, though if necessary the CAESAR can be operated by a crew as few as three. It can be transported by a C-130 or A400M heavy cargo aircraft.  It has a firing range of approximately  using an Extended Range, Full Bore (ERFB) shell, and more than  using rocket assisted shells. The system is integrated with a fully computerized system, providing automatic control. During Eurosatory 2006, CAESAR was exhibited with an automated laying system based on the SIGMA 30 inertial navigation system.

It is fast to set up for firing and to leave the firing position; it can fire six rounds and move away within two minutes.

In February 2022, Nexter was awarded a contract by the French Direction générale de l'armement (DGA) for the development of the CAESAR 6x6 Mark II new generation (NG) artillery system. The Mark II features a new chassis with a more powerful 460 hp engine and new automatic gearbox, new fire control software, and a Level 2 mine and ballistic armored cabin raising the vehicle's weight to 25 tonnes (27.56 tons). The contract begins a four-year development phase, after which the Mark II will enter production. In 2024, the DGA will choose whether to start production of 109 newly built Mark IIs or to procure 33 new vehicles while retrofitting the 76 CAESARs already in service.

CAESAR 8x8
On 16 September 2015 at DSEI 2015, Nexter unveiled the CAESAR 8x8 which features a high level of mobility ensured by a modified Tatra 817 8x8 chassis. The 8x8 CAESAR is fitted as standard with an unarmoured forward control four-person cab, but one of the options is a fully armour protected cab. Gross vehicle weight would depend on the level of armour protection, but is about 30 tonnes. It is powered by a 410 hp diesel engine. It holds 36 rounds.

Operational deployment
Eight CAESARs were sent to Afghanistan during the summer of 2009 to support French operations. They were deployed on 1 August 2009 by the 3rd Marine Artillery Regiment (3è RAMa), followed by five others, deployed as a firebase in FOB Tora, Tagab and Nijrab. They are fitted with cabin armor add-ons, with fireport.

The French Army deployed this system in southern Lebanon as part of the UNIFIL peace keeping force.

During Operation Serval in Mali, four CAESAR were deployed by the 68e régiment d'artillerie d'Afrique (68th Artillery Regiment of Africa).

In April 2011, the Royal Thai Army used the CAESAR against Cambodia's BM-21. The Thai Army claimed that they destroyed two or more BM-21 systems.

Several CAESAR were deployed in Mali by France during Operation Serval, in which they saw action in the Battle of Ifoghas, amongst others. France also deployed four CAESAR to Iraq for the Battle of Mosul, where French forces supported the Iraqi Army's operation to reclaim Mosul from ISIL from October 2016 to July 2017. Multiple CAESAR were deployed to Iraq on the border with Syria from 8 November 2018 to April 2019 to support the Syrian Democratic Forces in the Battle of Baghuz Fawqani, the ultimately successful operation to capture the final town held by the Islamic State group. They deployed to Firebase Saham, a base freshly constructed by the United States Army to provide fire support during the battle, especially during cloudy days when U.S. aircraft could not see to conduct airstrikes.

CAESAR howitzers may have been used by Saudi Arabia in the Yemeni war against civilian targets.

CAESAR howitzers were provided by France and used by Ukraine in the Russo-Ukrainian War.

Operators

Current operators
: On 14 March 2017 the CAESAR 8x8 was chosen to become the new artillery system of the Royal Danish Army. 19 howitzers were purchased and installed on Tatra 817 trucks. The delivery of all 19 systems was delayed until first half of 2023, however, the Danish parliament decided on 19 January 2023 to donate all systems to Ukraine.
: The first order (for 5 howitzers) was placed on 20 September 2000. The first five units were delivered in 2003. Following the evaluation, the main order of 72 units was made in late 2004. In July 2008, the first cannon of the first series of eight was delivered to the French Army. Although the order had not been signed , a requirement was set for 32 more CAESAR on the Tatra 8x8 chassis to replace the last Auf1 gun by 2030
: The Indonesian Army acquired 37 CAESAR units for $240 million, the first two arriving in mid September 2012. Another 18 were purchased in a follow-up order signed in February 2017.
: In 2006, GIAT announced a 76-unit sale plus a 4-unit option to an unspecified foreign customer, later confirmed to be Saudi Arabia. The 4 optional units became firm sales in January 2007, with the first two units to be assembled in France and the other 78 in Saudi Arabia. In March 2010, the Saudi Arabian National Guard (SANG) accepted its first four of a projected 100 systems.
: The 6 CAESAR is operated by the Royal Thai Army (RTA) from 2010, ordered in 2006, mounted on the Sherpa 6x6 truck chassis.
: 18 howitzers as of October 2022, with another 31 to be delivered. Following the 2022 Russian invasion of Ukraine, France sent 12 CAESARs to the Ukrainian Armed Forces. On 22 April 2022, 40 Ukrainian soldiers arrived in France for training on the system. Now operated by the 55th Artillery Brigade. The provision of 6 more CAESAR howitzers was announced by President Macron on 16 June 2022, bringing the total number donated to 18 6x6 variants. On 19 January 2023, the Danish defense minister announced that 19 8x8 variants that were to be delivered in the first half of 2023 to the Danish army would instead be donated to Ukraine. On 31 January 2023, France pledged an additional 12 Caesar howitzer for Ukraine.

Future operators
: Following the acquisition of the Griffon and Jaguar within the CaMo-program, Belgium decided in 2021 to order 9 CAESAR NG 6x6 howitzers in  a contract of approximately €48 million. In June 2022 a €62 million contract was signed for an additional 19 CAESAR NG to be delivered between 2025 and 2027.
: In January 2023, Colombia announced that it had ordered an unspecified number of CAESAR NG 6x6 howitzers from a contract of 101.7 million US dollars.
: In June 2020, CAESAR 8x8 won a €200 million contract for the Czech Army. The Army decided to buy 52 howitzers that will be installed on the Czech Tatra 815–7T3RC1 8×8. 10 additional units ordered in December 2022.
 In June 2022 Lithuania joined the CAESAR NG (Mk2) program with an order for 18 units, with first deliveries expected in 2026.
 In early 2020, Morocco inked the purchase of 36 CAESAR 6x6 howitzers.

Possible future operators 
 –The CAESAR was offered to the Brazilian Army as part of the "VBCOAP 155mm SR" program for the acquisition of 36 Self-propelled howitzer

Gallery

See also

Archer
DRDO ATAGS
ATMOS 2000
A-222 Bereg
2S22 Bohdana
DANA
G6 Rhino
AHS Kryl
Nora B-52
PCL-09
PCL-161
PCL-181
PLL-09
Type 19 
ZUZANA
RCH 155

References
Citations

External links

 CAESAR Renault Sherpa 5 Nexter wheeled self-propelled howitzer
 CAESAR 155mm Artillery System, France
 CAESAR page at Janes.com
 CAESAR description by Nexter Systems

Wheeled self-propelled howitzers
Post–Cold War artillery of France
155 mm artillery
Military vehicles introduced in the 2000s